Diaphus hudsoni, or Hudson's lanternfish, is a species of lanternfish found worldwide.

Size

Etymology
The fish is named for the Canadian Coast Guard Ship Hudson, in honor of the Hudson 70 Cruise around the Americas, during which the type specimen was collected.

References

Myctophidae
Fish described in 1976